Lake Uurainen is a medium-sized lake in central Finland, about 50 km northeast of the city Jyväskylä. It is a popular lake among fishers due to its good capture possibilities. In the northern part of the lake there is a long cape, which divides almost the whole lake.

See also
List of lakes in Finland

References

Lakes of Laukaa